Puliakulam Vinayagar Temple, is a Hindu temple located in the neighbourhood of Puliakulam in Coimbatore, Tamil Nadu, India. It is dedicated to the god Munthi Vinayagar, a form of Ganesha.The temple holds the largest Vinayagar idol in the entire Asian Continent.

History
The Vinayagar shrine was a sub-temple of the Puliakulam Mariamman temple. The present temple was opened in 1982 by the Devendra Kula Trust.

Idol
The idol is the largest Vinayagar statue in the entire Asian Continent. The statue was made out of a huge granite rock at Uthukuli. The statue is 19 feet high and weighs about 190 tonnes.

Ganesh Chathurthi Festival
The Ganesh Chathurthi Festival is celebrated every year since 1982, in a grandeur manner.

Connections
Arulmigu Munthi Vinayagar Temple has easy access to :
 Gandhipuram : Via Bharathiyar Road
 Coimbatore Integrated Bus Terminus : Via Ramanathapuram Road and Chettipalayam Road
 Ukkadam : Via  Puliakulam-Redfields Road and Sungam Bypass Road
 Singanallur Bus Terminus : Via Eastern Trichy Road
 Railway Station : Via Puliakulam-Redfields Road and Racecourse
 Coimbatore International Airport : Via Eastern Avinashi Road

References

 ஸ்ரீ முந்தி விநாயகர்
 Biggest Ganesha
 Biggest Ganesha Idol in PULIAKULAM, COIMBATORE

External Links 

Hindu temples in Coimbatore district
Tourist attractions in Coimbatore
Buildings and structures in Coimbatore